Kabuta is a town and commune of Angola, located in the province of Cuanza Sul.

See also 

 Communes of Angola

References 

Populated places in Cuanza Sul Province
Communes in Cuanza Sul Province